Association Feminista Ilonga, was a Filipino women's organization that was founded in 1906. 

It was founded by Pura Villanueva Kalaw. It followed the foundation of Asociacion Feminista Filipina, with the purpose of focusing on women's suffrage. The goal was finally acheived in the 1937 Philippine women's suffrage plebiscite.

References

 

Organizations established in 1906
1906 establishments
Women's rights organizations
Women's organizations based in the Philippines
1906 in the Philippines
Feminism in the Philippines
History of women in the Philippines